Ice dance was contested between 18 and 21 February 1994. 21 dancing couples from 16 nations participated.

Results

Referees
 Hans Kutschera
 Wolfgang Kunz (assistant referee)

Judges
 Elena Buriak
 Marie Lundmark
 Mary A. Parry 
 Irina Abasliamova
 Irina Mikhailovskaya
 Eric Couste
 Olga Záková 
 Ingrid Reetz
 Jean Senft
 Jean B. Robinson (substitute)

D
1994 in figure skating
1994
Mixed events at the 1994 Winter Olympics